Raj pattern refers either to a Thai men's costume consisting of a white Nehru-style jacket with five buttons, a chong kraben, knee-length socks and dress shoes, or to the specific form of the jacket itself. It was worn chiefly during the late nineteenth and early twentieth centuries by government officials and the upper class in Bangkok, and nowadays is used in select circumstances as a national costume.

History and use

The raj pattern was devised by King Chulalongkorn during his visit to British India in 1871, where he hired a Calcutta tailor to make a jacket with a standing collar and buttoned vertical opening. Previously in 1870, the king had had his entourage dress in a combination of chong kraben (a wrap worn with part of the fabric folded back between the legs and tucked behind the waist) and Western suit jacket, socks and shoes during his visit to Singapore and Java. This new jacket replaced the suit jacket, alleviating the need for a separate layer of shirt in the hot climate, and the dress soon became the de facto civil uniform. It was worn both officially and privately and remained popular until the Pibulsonggram era, when the chong kraben was banned by cultural mandate. The name raj pattern, from Pali rājā and English pattern and meaning royal pattern, was coined by Phon Bunnak (later the Chao Phraya Phasakorawong), who was acting as royal secretary during the king's journey.

Nowadays, the full raj pattern costume is worn only on select occasions as a national costume, and is employed regularly only in the tourism industry. The jacket, however, has found continued use in the dress uniforms of the civil and military services, as well as the formal clothing worn with the suea khrui as the academic dress of certain universities, where it is worn with trousers in the Western style. Another Thai garment which is very similar in design is the suea phraratchathan.

References

Thai clothing
Folk costumes
History of Asian clothing
Court uniforms and dress